Full Fathom Five is a live DVD by the American rock band Clutch. The full name of the DVD is Full Fathom Five: Video Field Recordings, differentiating from the accompanying album release Full Fathom Five. The DVD was released on November 11, 2008. The DVD has four cities venues recorded at on it, as opposed to the Album which only has three venues, them being:

The Boulder Theatre, Boulder, Colorado (tracks 11 & 12, August 20, 2007); The Metro Theatre, Sydney, Australia (tracks 4–5 & 19–20, December 15, 2007); The Starland Ballroom, Sayreville, New Jersey (tracks 13–15, December 29, 2007, and tracks 6–10, December 28, 2007); and Mr Smalls Theatre, Pittsburgh, Pennsylvania (tracks 1–3 & 16–18, March 20, 2008).

The reference to the HiFi Bar as the Sydney concert in some source material is incorrect, as it is in Melbourne, Australia (900 kilometers south of Sydney), which is from another live Australian recording, Heard It All Before: Live at the Hi Fi Bar. The same owners did open a venue in Sydney in 2012 with the same name.

Track listing 
 1 – "The Dragonfly"
 2 – "Child of the City"
 3 – "The Devil & Me"
 4 – "Promoter (of Earthbound Causes)"
 5 – "10001110101"
 6 – "The Soapmakers"
 7 – "Burning Beard"
 8 – "Escape From the Prison Planet"
 9 – "Texan Book of the Dead"
 10 – "Animal Farm"
 11 – "You Can't Stop Progress"
 12 – "Power Player"
 13 – "The Mob Goes Wild"
 14 – "Big News I"
 15 – "Big News II"
 16 – "The Elephant Riders"
 17 – "Ship of Gold"
 18 – "The Yeti"
 19 – "Electric Worry"
 20 – "One Eye Dollar"

Personnel 
Neil Fallon – vocals, guitar
Tim Sult – guitar
Dan Maines – bass
Jean-Paul Gaster – drums, percussion
Mick Schauer – Hammond B3, piano, Hohner clavinet

Production
Agent Ogden – director / producer
 Will Duderstadt – producer

References 

Clutch (band) video albums
2008 video albums
Live video albums
2008 live albums